Marco Sartori (born 14 December 1938) is an Italian former sailor who competed in the 1964 Summer Olympics.

References

1938 births
Living people
Italian male sailors (sport)
Olympic sailors of Italy
Sailors at the 1964 Summer Olympics – Flying Dutchman
Place of birth missing (living people)